The white-chested alethe (Chamaetylas fuelleborni) is a species of bird in the family Muscicapidae. It is found in Malawi, Mozambique, Tanzania, and Zambia.

Its natural habitat is subtropical or tropical moist lowland forests.

The binomial of the bird commemorates the German physician Friedrich Fülleborn.

References

white-chested alethe
Birds of East Africa
white-chested alethe
Taxonomy articles created by Polbot